Joba is a 2019 Nollywood faith based movie produced and directed by Biodun Stephen. It is an emotional movie that is based on love, strength and the existence of God. The film stars Blossom Chukwujekwu, Enado Odigie, Chris Ihuewa, Ronke Ojo, and Christine Osifuye.

Synopsis 
The film revolves around a Christian family who is battling with balancing their marriage and faith. Their beliefs were tested when all indications show that the husband is the cause of the problems.

Premiere 
The movie was first premiered on April 5, 2019, at Genesis Cinemas, Maryland Mall, Lagos, Nigeria. The movie was also premiered in Ghana, South Africa, YouTube and BBNaija House. The premiering was graced with celebrities such as Bisola Aiyeola, Woli Arole and Wole Oladiyun.

Cast 
Blossom Chukwujekwu
Enadio Odigie
Ronke Ojo
Chris Ihuewa
Christine Osifuye.

References 

2019 films
Nigerian drama films
English-language Nigerian films